The 787th Air Expeditionary Squadron is a provisional United States Air Force unit, assigned to United States Air Forces Europe.  The squadron has been activated twice for contingency operations in Africa.

The squadron was first organized in August 1943 as the 787th Bombardment Squadron, a heavy bomber unit.  After training in the United States with Consolidated B-24 Liberators, the 787th moved to England, where it participated in the strategic bombing campaign against Germany.  Following V-E Day, it returned to the United States, where it began training with Boeing B-29 Superfortresses, but was inactivated in October 1945.

In 1965, the squadron was briefly active under the 33d Tactical Fighter Wing as a McDonnell F-4 Phantom II squadron, but its personnel and equipment were transferred to another unit within four months of its activation.

History

World War II

Training in the United States
The 787th Bombardment Squadron was activated at Alamogordo Army Air Field on 1 August 1943 as one of the four original squadrons of the 466th Bombardment Group.  After training there with Consolidated B-24 Liberators, the squadron departed for the European Theater of Operations in February 1944.  The ground echelon proceeded to the port of embarkation for transport to Europe by ship, while the air echelon ferried their Liberators via the South Atlantic Ferry route.

Combat in Europe

The squadron arrived at its combat station, RAF Attlebridge in England in March 1944.  It flew its first combat mission on 22 March in an attack on Berlin, Germany.  It engaged primarily in the strategic bombing campaign against Germany, with targets that included oil refineries and facilities at Bohlen and Misburg, marshalling yards at Liège and Saarbrücken, factories at Brunswick, Kempten and Eisenach, repair facilities at Reims, mining facilities near Hamburg and airfields at Saint-Trond and Chartres.

The squadron also flew air support and air interdiction missions.  It attacked pillboxes in Normandy on D-Day to support Operation Overlord and performed interdiction missions against targets beyond the beachhead in the following days.  During Operation Cobra, the breakout at Saint Lo in July, it bombed German positions in the city.  It attacked lines of communication during the Battle of the Bulge in December 1944 and January 1945.  On 24 March, it supported Operation Varsity, the airborne assault across the Rhine by attacking a military air base at Nordhorn.  The squadron's last mission of the war was flown on 25 April 1945 against electrical facilities at Traunstein.

Return to the United States and inactivation
Following V-E Day, the squadron returned to the United States. The squadron reassembled at Sioux Falls Army Air Field, South Dakota in late July 1945. In August, the squadron moved to Davis-Monthan Field, Arizona to begin training with the Boeing B-29 Superfortress. However with the surrender of Japan, the squadron was inactivated in October as Davis-Monthan transitioned from a training base to a storage facility.

Fighter operations

As the United States Air Force expanded its McDonnell F-4 Phantom II fleet in April 1965, it activated the 33d Tactical Fighter Wing at Eglin Air Force Base Florida.  Although it was planned that the squadrons of the 33d Wing would be Convair F-102 Delta Dagger squadrons that were inactivating in the Pacific, these squadrons were still winding down their operations, so the 33d was initially formed with the 786th, 787th, 788th and 789th Tactical Fighter Squadrons.  The 33d embarked on a program of tactical training with the Phantom.  In June 1965, the squadron was inactivated and its planes and personnel were transferred to the 16th Tactical Fighter Squadron, which moved on paper to Eglin from Misawa Air Base, Japan.

Expeditionary unit
In April 2006, the squadron was converted to provisional status as the 787th Air Expeditionary Squadron and assigned to United States Air Forces Europe to activate or inactivate as needed.  It deployed to Karadje, Niger in July to support Operation Eagle Vision, downloading satellite imagery for mapmaking.

The squadron was activated at Dakar, Senegal, where it established a transportation hub for Operation Unified Assistance, the US military name for humanitarian operations to limit the spread of Ebola in West Africa.  It relieved members of the Kentucky Air National Guard's 123d Contingency Support Group.  It continued airlift missions with Lockheed C-130 Hercules aircraft for the next four months.

Lineage
 Constituted as the 787th Bombardment Squadron (Heavy) on 19 May 1943
 Activated on 1 August 1943
 Redesignated 787th Bombardment Squadron, Heavy c. 10 August 1944
 Redesignated 787th Bombardment Squadron, Very Heavy on 5 August 1945
 Inactivated on 17 October 1945
 Redesignated 787th Tactical Fighter Squadron on 9 February 1965 and activated (not organized)
 Organized on 1 April 1965
 Inactivated on 20 June 1965
 Converted to provisional status and redesignated 787th Air Expeditionary Squadron on 24 April 2006
 Active July 2006
 Activated c. 18 November 2014
 Inactivated c. 13 February 2015

Assignments
 466th Bombardment Group, 1 August 1943 – 17 October 1945
 Tactical Air Command, 9 February 1965 (not organized)
 33d Tactical Fighter Wing, 1 April–20 June 1965
 United States Air Forces Europe to activate or inactivate as needed after 24 April 2006
 Attached to 86th Airlift Wing, July 2006
 Attached to 435th Air Ground Operations Wing, c. 18 November 2014 – c. 13 February 2015

Stations
 Alamogordo Army Air Field, New Mexico, 1 August 1943
 Kearns Army Air Base, Utah 31 August 1943
 Alamogordo Army Air Field, New Mexico, 30 November 1943 - 10 February 1944
 RAF Attlebridge (AAF-120), England 9 March 1944 - c. 6 July 1945
 Sioux Falls Army Air Field, South Dakota, 15 July 1945
 Pueblo Army Air Base, Colorado, 25 July 1945
 Davis-Monthan Field, Arizona, 15 August-17 October 1945
 Eglin Air Force Base, Florida, 1 April–20 June 1965
 Karadje, Niger, July 2006
 Léopold Sédar Senghor International Airport, Sengal, c. 18 November 2014 – c. 13 February 2015

Aircraft
 Consolidated B-24 Liberator, 1943–1945
 Boeing B-29 Superfortress, 1945
 McDonnell F-4 Phantom, 1965
 Lockheed C-130J Hercules

Awards and campaigns

See also

 List of C-130 Hercules operators
 List of F-4 Phantom II operators
 List of B-29 Superfortress operators
 B-24 Liberator units of the United States Army Air Forces

References
 Notes

 Notes

Bibliography

 
 
 
 
 

Air expeditionary squadrons of the United States Air Force